During the Second War of Schleswig, the fortifications of Danevirke were evacuated by the Danish army in 1864. This marked the last military use of the ancient defence structure of Danevirke, which has remained in German possession ever since.

Background
Due to emotive nationalist symbolism, public opinion in Denmark had expected the coming battle to take place at the Danevirke. The fortifications were already under attack, but no battle took place there, except some early skirmishing in close proximity just south of it, as the Danish Commander in Chief, General de Meza, withdrew his forces to the trenches at Dybbøl. General De Meza feared being outflanked, as the Schlei and the wetlands between the Danevirke and Husum had frozen solid in a hard winter, and because the territory immediately in front of the Danevirke had already fallen into German hands.

Actions
This retreat came as a surprise to the Austro-Prussian army, and almost all of the Danish army succeeded in completing the evacuation. It resulted, however, in the abandonment of important pieces of heavy artillery, and it remains a matter of historical debate why the railway to Flensburg was never properly used for the evacuation.

Aftermath
News of the retreat came as a great shock to Danish public opinion which had considered the Danevirke to be impregnable, and General de Meza was promptly relieved of his command.

References
 
 
 

Conflicts in 1864
Battles involving Denmark
Battles involving Prussia
Battles of the Second Schleswig War
Evacuation of Danevirke
Evacuation of Danevirke
Dannevirke
Battles in Schleswig-Holstein